Abu Bakr Muhammad ibn Ishaq ibn Khuzaymah (837 CE/223 AH – 923 CE/311 AH) was a prominent Persian Muslim Muhaddith and Shafi'i jurist, best known for his hadith collection, Sahih Ibn Khuzaymah.

Biography 
He was born in Nishapur a year earlier than Ibn Jarir al-Tabari and outlived him by one year. In Nishapur, he studied under its scholars, including Ishaq Ibn Rahwayh (died 238 AH), the muhaddith of Khorasan at the time, as well as with al-Bukhari and Muslim.

Works 
Al-Hakim recorded that Ibn Khuzaymah wrote more than 140 books. Little of what he wrote survives today:

 Saheeh ibn Kuzaima: mukhtaṣar al-Mukhtaṣar min al-musnad al-Ṣaḥīḥ: Only one fourth of the book survived. It is a collection of hadiths, covering prayer, fasting, pilgrimage, and the zakāt tithe. Among the Sahih collections after Sahih Bukhari and Sahih Muslim, it is regarded highly along with Sahih Ibn Hibbaan and Sahih Abi 'Awana. It has been edited by Muhammad Mustafa Al-A'zami and published by al-Maktab al-Islami in Beirut.
 Kitāb al-Tawḥīd wa-ithbāt ṣifāt al-Rabb ’azza wa-jall –  Recently, an English translation of the work has been initiated which is being publish piecemeal on https://kitabaltawhidenglish.blogspot.com/. 
 Sha’n al-du‘ā’ wa-tafsīr al-ad‘īyah al-ma’thūrah
 Fāʼid al-Fāʼid

See also 
 Asas al-Taqdis

References 

837 births
923 deaths
Hadith scholars
Hadith compilers
Sunni Muslim scholars of Islam
Shafi'is
Atharis
Muhaddiths from Nishapur
Iranian scholars
9th-century jurists
10th-century jurists
Biographical evaluation scholars